Cephalodella is a genus of rotifers in the family Notommatidae.

Cephalodella vittata is a species endemic to Lake Baikal.

Selected species 
 Cephalodella auritculata
 Cephalodella catellina
 Cephalodella elegans
 Cephalodella forficata
 Cephalodella forficula
 Cephalodella gibba (Ehrenberg, 1830)
 Cephalodella hoodi
 Cephalodella marina Myers, 1924
 Cephalodella sterea
 Cephalodella vittata

References 

 O'Reilly, M. (2001). Rotifera, in: Costello, M.J. et al. (Ed.) (2001). European register of marine species: a check-list of the marine species in Europe and a bibliography of guides to their identification. Collection Patrimoines Naturels, 50: pages 149-151
 Jersabek, C.D.; Weithoff, G.; Weisse, T. 2011: Cephalodella acidophila n. sp. (Monogononta: Notommatidae), a new rotifer species from highly acidic mining lakes. Zootaxa, 2939: 50–58.
 Smet, W.H. de & Verolet, M. 2016. Epibiotic rotifers of Gammarus pulex (L.) (Crustacea, Amphipoda), with descriptions of two new species and notes on the terminology of the trophi. Zootaxa 4107 (3): 301–320.

External links 
 
 
 

Rotifer genera
Ploima